Diane Simpson may refer to:

 Diane Simpson-Bundy (born 1969), American athlete
 Diane Simpson (artist) (born 1935), American artist